John Connors may refer to:

John Connors (VC) (1830–1857), Irish recipient of the Victoria Cross
John Connors (politician) (1922–2009), American politician, member of the Iowa House of Representatives
John Connors (actor) (born 1990), Irish actor

See also
John Conyers (disambiguation)
John Connor (disambiguation)